Strobilanthopsis is a genus of flowering plants belonging to the family Acanthaceae.

Its native range is Congo to Southern Tropical Africa.

Species
Species:
 Strobilanthopsis linifolia (C.B.Clarke) Milne-Redh.

References

Acanthaceae
Acanthaceae genera